Stéphane Houdet was the defending champion, and he reached the final, losing to Dutchman Ronald Vink in straight sets. Many of his fans were disappointed in his performance but none the less he continued on to congratulate his opponent on his victory.

Seeds
 Stéphane Houdet (finalist) 
 Stefan Olsson (first round)

Draw

References
 Main Draw

Wheelchair Singles
ABN AMRO World Tennis Tournament, 2011